En attendant Cousteau (English title: Waiting for Cousteau) is the tenth studio album by French electronic musician and composer Jean-Michel Jarre, released on Disques Dreyfus, licensed to Polydor. The album was dedicated to Jacques-Yves Cousteau and was released on his 80th birthday 11 June 1990. AllMusic described the album as "groundbreaking stuff", due to its stylistic differences from his other albums.
The album reached Number 14 in the UK charts. En attendant Cousteau is divided into two distinct stylistic halves: the first three pieces titled "Calypso" and the title track, an ambient piece which was used in the soundtrack of a 1991 documentary entitled "Palawan: Le dernier refuge" by Cousteau and Jarre.

Track listing

CD edition

Vinyl and cassette edition

Personnel 
Personnel listed in album liner notes:
 Jean-Michel Jarre – keyboards
 The Amoco Renegades – steel drums
 Guy Delacroix – bass
 Christophe Deschamps – drums
 Michel Geiss – keyboards
 Dominique Perrier – keyboards

Charts

Certifications and sales

!scope="row"|Worldwide
|
|1,550,000
|-

References

External links 
 Waiting for Cousteau at Discogs

1990 albums
Jean-Michel Jarre albums
Disques Dreyfus albums